Daniel Gooch is the name of:

Daniel Gooch (1816–1889), Chairman of the Great Western Railway
Daniel Linn Gooch (1853–1913), U.S. Representative from Kentucky
Daniel W. Gooch (1820–1891), U.S. Representative from Massachusetts
Daniel Gooch (1869–1926), dog handler for the Imperial Trans-Antarctic Expedition and grandson of the railway pioneer

See also
 Gooch (disambiguation), for other people using this name.